Oleksandr Volkov (born 30 April 1948) is a Ukrainian politician, People's Deputy of Ukraine of the 3th, 4th and 7th convocations.

Personal life
He is married with three children.

References 

1948 births
Third convocation members of the Verkhovna Rada
Fourth convocation members of the Verkhovna Rada
Seventh convocation members of the Verkhovna Rada
Living people
Recipients of the Honorary Diploma of the Cabinet of Ministers of Ukraine